Neave is an unincorporated community located in Bracken County, Kentucky, United States.

History
A post office called Neave was established in 1879, and remained in operation until 1906. A variant name was Holton's Corner.

References

Unincorporated communities in Bracken County, Kentucky
Unincorporated communities in Kentucky